Vos is a Dutch surname meaning "fox". With 30,279 people, it was the 15th most common surname in the Netherlands  in 2007. Notable people with this name include:

Aafje Looijenga-Vos (1928–2018), Dutch chemist and crystallographer
Aart Vos (1905–1990), Dutch WWII resistance worker, husband of Johtje Vos
Amalberga Vos (fl. 1534-1572), Dutch abbess
André Vos (born 1975), South African rugby player
Arie Vos (born 1976), Dutch motorcycle racer
Auguste Vos (1902–?), Belgian shot putter
 (1888–1954), Dutch sculptor
Chris Vos (born 1998), Dutch para-snowboarder
Edgar Vos (1931–2010), Dutch fashion designer
Ella Vos, American pop singer-songwriter; stage name of Lauren Salamone
Freek Vos (born 1997), Dutch basketball player
Geerhardus Vos (1862–1949), American Reformed theologian
Geoffrey Vos (born 1955), QC UK High Court Judge, Master of the Rolls
Gino Vos (born 1990), Dutch darts player 
Harry Vos (1946–2010), Dutch footballer
Hein Vos (1903–1972), Dutch Labour Party politician
Hendrik Vos (died 1523), Flemish monk, one of the first two Lutheran martyrs
Henk Vos (born 1968), Dutch football player and coach
Hubert Vos (1855–1935), Dutch painter
Ida Vos (1931–2006), Dutch author
Ingmar Vos (born 1986), Dutch Decathlete
Jan Vos (1612–1667), Dutch poet and playwright
Jan Vos (1888–1939), Dutch footballer
Jan Vos (born 1972), Dutch Labour Party politician
Janneke Vos (born 1977),  Dutch racing cyclist
Jannie van Eyck-Vos (born 1936), Dutch track and field athlete
Johannes G. Vos (born 1949), Dutch-born Irish chemist
Johtje Vos (1909–2007), Dutch WWII resistance worker, wife of Aart Vos
Laurence Vos (Born 1989), UBT Group Buying Business Development Manager
Maaike Vos (born 1985), Dutch short track speed skater
Maria Vos (1824–1906), Dutch still-life painter
Marianne Vos (born 1987), Dutch cyclo-cross and road bicycle racer
Marijke Vos (born 1957), Dutch politician
Marik Vos-Lundh (1923–1994), Swedish costume and production designer
Mark Vos (born 1983), Australian professional poker player
Mei Li Vos (born 1970), Dutch politician and trade unionist
Michiel Vos (born 1970), Dutch-American journalist, lawyerand jurist
Ralph Vos (born 1996), Dutch footballer
Rich Vos (born 1957), American comedian
Robbert Vos (born 1986), Dutch euphonium player and conductor
Robin J. Vos (born 1968), American politician in Wisconsin
Roelf Vos (1921–1992), Tasmanian businessman; founder of a supermarket chain
Roosje Vos (1860–1932), Dutch trade unionist and women's rights activist
Sander Vos (born 1967), Dutch film editor
Suzanne Vos (contemporary), South African politician
Uli Vos (1946–2017), German field hockey player
Willem Vos (born 1964), Dutch physicist
Xandré Vos (born 1996), South African rugby player

Fictional people
Jan Vos, character in radio and television shows by Wim T. Schippers
Quinlan Vos, character in the Star Wars universe
Vos, character in Minecraft Story Mode Season 2

See also 
 De Vos
 Fox (surname)
 Fuchs (surname)
 Voss (surname)
 Joan Vohs (1927–2001), American model and actress

References

Dutch-language surnames
Surnames from nicknames